The Thuringian-Franconian Highlands are a natural region of Germany which is designated as D48 or 39 by the BfN. It consists mainly of a ridge of mountains up to just under 1,000 m high between the Central Upland areas of the Thuringian Forest, Thuringian Slate Mountains, Franconian Forest and Fichtel Mountains, and which runs from west and south Thuringia through Upper Franconia and southeast to just before the Czech border and the so-called Bohemian Massif.

Major natural divisions 
39 (=D48) Thuringian-Franconian Highlands
390 Southern Foreland of the Thuringian Forest
391 Thuringian Forest
392 Thuringian Highland (including the Franconian Forest)
393 Münchberg Heights
394 High Fichtel Mountains
395 Selb-Wunsiedel Plateau
396 Naab-Wondreb Bowl

Sources 
 Emil Meynen (ed.): Handbuch der naturräumlichen Gliederung Deutschlands. Selbstverlag der Bundesanstalt für Landeskunde, Remagen, 1953-1962 (Part 1, contains Issues 1–5), ISBN B0000BJ19E
 Emil Meynen (ed.): Handbuch der naturräumlichen Gliederung Deutschlands. Selbstverlag der Bundesanstalt für Landeskunde, Remagen, 1959-1962 (Part 2, contains Issues 6–9), ISBN B0000BJ19F

External links 
BfN fact files:
Nordwestern Thuringian Forest
Central Thuringian Forest
Southern Foreland of the Thuringian Forest
High Thuringian Slate Mountains
Schwarza-Sormitz Region
Schalkau Plateau
Franconian Forest
Münchberg Heights
High Fichtel Mountains
Selb-Wunsiedel Heights
Selb Forest
Naab-Wondreb Bowl

Mountain ranges of Thuringia
Mountain ranges of Bavaria
Geography of Thuringia
Geography of Bavaria
Highlands
Natural regions of the Central Uplands